The Cabinet of the United States, which is the principal advisory body to the president of the United States, has had 25 permanent African-American members serving as vice president or head of one of the federal executive departments and 10 African-American as cabinet-level officials, which can differ under each president. Of that number, one African-American was elected vice president, one was appointed to the helm of multiple different departments, and no one served both as Cabinet and Cabinet-rank officeholders. The U.S. Census Bureau defines African Americans as citizens or residents of the United States who have origins in any of the black populations of Africa. The term is generally used for Americans with at least partial ancestry in any of the original peoples of sub-Saharan Africa. During the founding of the federal government, African Americans were consigned to a status of second-class citizenship or enslaved. No African American ever held a cabinet position before the Civil Rights Movement or the signing of the Civil Rights Act of 1964, which banned discrimination in public accommodations, employment, and labor unions.

Robert C. Weaver became the first African-American to serve in a president's cabinet when he was appointed secretary of housing and urban development by President Lyndon B. Johnson in 1966. Patricia Roberts Harris was the first black woman to serve in a presidential cabinet when she was named to the same position by President Jimmy Carter in 1977. Two years later, Carter tapped her for secretary of health and human services, thus making her the first African-American to hold two different cabinet positions. 

On January 20, 2001, Colin Powell was appointed secretary of state, which is first in the United States presidential line of succession among Cabinet secretaries, which in turn makes him the highest-ranking African-American in the federal government's history. On January 26, 2005, Condoleezza Rice became the highest-ranking black woman in line when she was appointed to the same position. On January 20, 2021, Kamala Harris replaced both Powell and Rice as the highest-ranking African-American person in the line of succession when she was inaugurated as vice president.

President Bill Clinton named the most African-Americans as secretaries to his first-term Cabinet, with four: former DAV executive director Jesse Brown as secretary of veterans affairs; DNC chairman Ron Brown as secretary of commerce; U.S. representative Mike Espy (D-MS) as secretary of agriculture; and corporate director Hazel R. O'Leary as secretary of energy. Clinton exceeded that record by three, including cabinet reshuffles during his second term in office.

The Department of Housing and Urban Development has had the most African-American secretaries, with six. The Department of Transportation has had three; the departments of Education, Health and Human Services, Justice, State, and Veterans Affairs have had two; the departments of Agriculture, Commerce, Defense, Energy, Homeland Security, and Labor have had one. The departments of Interior and Treasury are the only existing executive departments that do not have African-American secretaries yet. 

The totals for this list include only African-American presidential appointees confirmed (if necessary) by the United States Senate to cabinet or cabinet-level positions and taking their oath of office; they do not include acting officials or nominees awaiting confirmation.

Permanent Cabinet members
The following list includes African-Americans who have held permanent positions in the Cabinet, all of whom are in the line of succession to the presidency. The table below is organized based on the beginning of their terms in office. Officeholders whose terms begin the same day are ranked according to presidential order of succession.

 denotes the first African-American holder of that particular office

Former permanent Cabinet members 
 The Postmaster General ceased to be a member of the Cabinet when the Post Office Department was re-organized into the United States Postal Service, a special agency independent of the executive branch, by the 1970 Postal Reorganization Act. No African American had ever served while it was a Cabinet post.
 The Secretaries of the Navy, of the Air Force, and of the Army ceased to be members of the Cabinet when the Department of the Navy was absorbed into the Department of Defense in 1947. No African American had ever served while they were Cabinet posts.
 The Secretary of War became defunct when the Department of War became the Department of Defense in 1947. No African American had ever served while it was a Cabinet post.
 The Secretary of Commerce and Labor became defunct when the Department of Commerce and Labor was subdivided into two separate entities in 1913. No African American had ever served while it was a Cabinet post.

Cabinet-level positions
The president may designate or remove additional officials as cabinet members. These positions have not always been in the Cabinet, so some African American officeholders may not be listed.

The following list includes African-Americans who have held cabinet-rank positions, which can vary under each president. They are not in the line of succession and are not necessarily officers of the United States. The table below is organized based on the beginning of their terms in office while it was raised to cabinet-level status. Officeholders whose terms begin the same day are ranked alphabetically by last name.

  denotes the first African-American holder of that particular office

See also

African Americans in the United States Congress
List of African-American United States senators
List of African-American United States representatives
List of first African-American mayors
Black Cabinet
List of female United States Cabinet members
List of foreign-born United States Cabinet members
List of Hispanic and Latino American United States Cabinet members
List of minority governors and lieutenant governors in the United States

Notes

References

External links
The Cabinet - Provided by the White House. Retrieved 24 January 2016.

+
Lists of African-American people